Israel is represented by 10 athletes  (7 men and 3 women) at the 2012 European Athletics Championships held in Helsinki, Finland.

The team
The Israeli team to the 21st European Athletics Champs includes 10 athletes (7 men and 3 women). Donald Sanford is the top name in the men team along with talented high jumper Dmitriy Kroyter and improved triple jumper Yochai Halevi. Pole vaulter Jillian Schwartz is the most experienced from the female trio. She was World Championships finalist in 2005 when competing for USA.

Participants

References 

 2012 European Athletics Championships
 Another Israeli 4x400m record gives lustre to relays project

Nations at the 2012 European Athletics Championships
2012
European Athletics Championships